Acontia opalinoides is a moth of the family Noctuidae first described by Achille Guenée in 1852.

Distribution
It is found in many African countries such as Angola, Eritrea, Ethiopia, Kenya, Mali, Mauritania, Namibia, Somalia, Sudan and Tanzania. It is also found in Old World tropics of Sri Lanka, and India.

Host plants are Abutilon and Gossypium species.

References

Moths of Asia
Moths described in 1852
opalinoides